Steven M. Girvin is an American physicist who is the Eugene Higgins Professor of Physics  at Yale University and who served as deputy provost for research at Yale from 2007 to 2017. Girvin is noted for his theoretical work on quantum many body systems such as the fractional quantum Hall effect, and as co-developer of circuit QED, the application of the ideas of quantum optics to superconducting microwave circuits.  Circuit QED is now the leading architecture for construction of quantum computers based on superconducting qubits.

Biography
Girvin was born in Austin, Texas in 1950 and went to high school in the small village of Brant Lake, New York. A graduate of Bates College and the University of Maine, Girvin received his Ph.D. in physics from Princeton University in 1977 after completing a doctoral dissertation, titled "Topics in condensed matter physics: the role of exchange in the lithium K edge and the fluorescence spectrum of heavily doped cadmium sulphide", under the supervision of John J. Hopfield. Girvin worked as a post-doctoral researcher at Indiana University, Bloomington and at Chalmers University of Technology in Goteborg, Sweden.   He then held a staff scientist position at the National Bureau of Standards (1979–87) and a held faculty position at Indiana University (1987-2001), before joining Yale as a Professor of Physics in 2001.

Girvin's research focus has been theoretical study of collective quantum behavior in strongly correlated many body systems and their phase transitions, he has worked on problems such as the quantum Hall effect, the superconductor-insulator transition, and quantum spin chains. He works with experimentalists Robert Schoelkopf and Michel Devoret on the engineering problem of building a quantum computer, and on developing "circuit QED" using superconducting electrical circuits. The group experimentally implemented the first all-electronic quantum processor and executed two-qubit quantum algorithms in 2009. Girvin co-edited the book "The Quantum Hall Effect", which has been translated to Japanese, Chinese and Russian.  Together with co-author Kun Yang, Girvin published the Cambridge Press textbook "Modern Condensed Matter Physics" in 2019.

Girvin, James P. Eisenstein and Allan H. MacDonald won the 2007 Oliver E. Buckley Condensed Matter Prize for their "Fundamental experimental and theoretical research on correlated many-electron states in low dimensional systems".

In September 2020, Girvin was appointed as the founding director of the Co-design Center for Quantum Advantage (C2QA) located at Brookhaven National Laboratory, one of five national quantum information science research centers funded by the Department of Energy. C2QA comprises 88 principal investigators across 24 institutions who "do the basic research needed to make dramatic advances in the performance of quantum computer modules".

Honors
Hedersdoktor (Honoris Causus Doctorate), Chalmers University of Technology (2017)
Shared the Oliver E. Buckley Condensed Matter Prize (2007)
Foreign Associate of the Royal Swedish Academy of Sciences (2007)
Fellow of the American Association for the Advancement of Science (2007)
Member of the Connecticut Academy of Sciences (2007)
Member of the National Academy of Sciences (2006)
Member of the American Academy of Arts and Sciences (2004)
Fellow of the American Physical Society (1989)

References

External links
Department page
Personal page

1950 births
Living people
People from Austin, Texas
People from Warren County, New York
Yale University faculty
21st-century American physicists
Bates College alumni
Princeton University alumni
Scientists from New York (state)
Fellows of the American Physical Society
Fellows of the American Academy of Arts and Sciences
Oliver E. Buckley Condensed Matter Prize winners